Lower Lydbrook railway station served the civil parish of Lydbrook, Gloucestershire, England, from 1875 to 1903 on the Severn and Wye Railway.

History 
The station was opened on 23 September 1875 by the Severn and Wye Railway. Access to the station was difficult because there was no access via road and passengers had to cross a steep footbridge to get to it. At the beginning of 1903, it was downgraded to an unstaffed request stop and it closed three months later on 1 April 1903.

References 

Disused railway stations in Gloucestershire
Railway stations in Great Britain opened in 1875
Railway stations in Great Britain closed in 1903
1875 establishments in England
1903 disestablishments in England